Torgerson is a surname. Notable people with the surname include:

Helena Stone Torgerson (1878–1941), American harpist and composer
Martin T. Torgerson (1875–1939), American sailor
Ryan Torgerson (1972–2011), American rower
Stan Torgerson (1924–2006), American radio personality